Nellie Barbara Eales (14 April 1889 – 7 December 1989) was a British zoologist. She was a senior lecturer at the University of Reading and published research papers on a variety of zoological topics as well as a two volume catalogue on Professor F. J. Cole's extensive library.

Education 
In 1910 she became one of the first women in the United Kingdom to graduate with a zoological degree as well as the first woman to graduate with a doctorate from University College, Reading.

Career 
She worked at the Marine Biological Association and in 1912 was appointed as curator of the University of Reading Zoological Department. She spent her career at Reading University progressing to the post of senior lecturer. Eales was a member of the University Senate from 1928 until 1942. She retired from her position at Reading University in 1954.

Eales was instrumental in obtaining Professor F. J. Cole's library of over 8000 books for University of Reading. She would go on to publish a two volume catalogue of his book collection.

Eales was a fellow of the Zoological Society of London and was President of the Malacological Society of London from 1948–1951. She served as editor of the Proceedings of the Malacological Society from 1956 to 1969.

Eales died on 7 December 1989.

References

1889 births
1989 deaths
20th-century British zoologists
20th-century British women scientists
Alumni of the University of Reading